Three ships of the United States Navy have been named Buchanan, in honor of Captain (USN), Admiral (CSN) Franklin Buchanan.

She was transferred to the Turkish Navy as Gelibolu.
 , was a  guided missile destroyer, commissioned in 1962 and decommissioned in 1991.

References

United States Navy ship names